Caroline McWilliams (April 4, 1945 – February 11, 2010) was an American actress, best known for her portrayal of Marcy Hill in the television series Benson.  McWilliams had also appeared in nine episodes of its parent-series Soap, as Sally. She was a regular on the CBS soap Guiding Light (as Janet Norris) for several years and appeared in a short-term role (as Tracy DeWitt) on the NBC soap Another World. She also had a recurring role on Beverly Hills, 90210 playing the mother of Jamie Walters' character, Ray Pruit.

Personal life
 
McWilliams was born in Seattle and grew up in Rhode Island. She graduated in 1966 with a bachelor's degree from Carnegie Mellon University in Pittsburgh. She was married in 1982 to Michael Keaton, with whom she had a son, Sean. She and Keaton divorced in 1990.

Career
McWilliams's television appearances spanned every decade from the 1960s through the 2000s. She was a regular player on Guiding Light as Janet Mason Norris from 1969 until 1975. She portrayed a prostitute who helped an immigrant stay in the country by marrying him for money on Barney Miller in 1977. She was a semi-regular on Soap during  the second season in 1978. She then appeared on Benson (as a different character) when that series premiered in 1979.  She remained on Benson until 1981: the storyline stated that her character was departing to move away with her husband (her fiancé-turned-husband on the show having been played by Ted Danson).

On stage, she appeared in the musical Boccaccio, Cat on a Hot Tin Roof, The Rothschilds and productions with the American Shakespeare Festival in Stratford, Connecticut, and the New York Shakespeare Festival.

After this, she made a number of appearances in television comedies and dramas, including Kojak; Quincy, M.E.; The Incredible Hulk; $weepstake$; Project U.F.O.; Hill Street Blues; Night Court; St. Elsewhere; Cagney & Lacey; Sisters (two episodes); Home Improvement; Murphy Brown and Judging Amy (three episodes). In 1989, she portrayed the ghostly wife, Clair Pritchard, in the short-lived comedy series Nearly Departed. She also appeared in numerous made-for-television movies, including The Death of Ocean View Park (1979), Rage! (1980), The Gift of Life (1982), and Sworn to Silence (1987). In 1982, she starred in Cass Malloy, a CBS sitcom television pilot which aired as a one-off that summer but did not result in a regular series, although it served as the basis for She's the Sheriff, which aired in first-run syndication from 1987 to 1989 with Suzanne Somers in the starring role.

McWilliams appeared in two major motion pictures:
White Water Summer (1987) – as Virginia Block
Mermaids (1990) – as Carrie

Illness and death
McWilliams died from multiple myeloma at her home in Los Angeles, California, on February 11, 2010, aged 64.

References

External links

 
 

1945 births
2010 deaths
Actresses from Rhode Island
American Shakespearean actresses
American television actresses
Burials at Forest Lawn Memorial Park (Hollywood Hills)
Deaths from cancer in California
Deaths from multiple myeloma
People from Greater Los Angeles
Carnegie Mellon University College of Fine Arts alumni
20th-century American actresses
American film actresses
Actresses from Seattle
21st-century American actresses
American soap opera actresses
American stage actresses